The women's heavyweight is a competition featured at the 2013 World Taekwondo Championships, and was held at the Exhibition Center of Puebla in Puebla, Mexico on July 18. Heavyweights were limited to a minimum of 73 kilograms in body mass.

Medalists

Results
DQ — Won by disqualification
P — Won by punitive declaration

Final

Top half

Bottom half

References
Entry List
Draw
Results
Results Book Pages 851–880

Women's 74
Worl